Samsung M8910 (also known as Samsung Pixon12) is a high-spec mobile phone from Samsung released in June 2009.

It has many features found only in digital cameras, such as Variable aperture, tracking touch autofocus, geo-tagging, face, smile and blink detection, wide dynamic range, Smart Auto mode, image stabilization etc.

Full specifications
Camera
Megapixels: 12 (Wide-Angle Lens)
Maximum photo resolution: 4000x3000 pixels
Optical zoom: None
Digital zoom: 4x
Auto focus: Yes
Flash: Yes
Recording video: 480p recording at 30fps
Second (front) camera:	Yes

References

M8910
Mobile phones introduced in 2009

https://web.archive.org/web/20100629214114/http://www.priceofmobiles.com/categories/desc_samsungm8910pixon12.php